Sapwood may refer to:

 Sapwood (wood), the part of living wood where sap flows, as distinct from the heartwood, where it doesn't  
 SS-6 Sapwood, the NATO reporting name for the R-7 Semyorka intercontinental ballistic missile